Benson Municipal Airport  is a public use airport located  northwest of the central business district of Benson, a city in Cochise County, Arizona, United States and  east of Tucson International Airport (TUS). The airport was opened in November 1999.

Although most US airports use the same three-letter location identifier for the FAA, IATA, and ICAO 'Benson Municipal Airport is only assigned  E95 by the FAA.

Facilities and aircraft 
It has one runway:
 10/28 measuring  asphalt

For the 12-month period ending April 15, 2017, the airport had 24,400 aircraft operations, an average of 67 per day: 92% general aviation, and 2% military. At that time there were 38 aircraft based at this airport: 84% single-engine, 5% ultralight, 3% multi-engine, 5% jet, and 3% helicopters.

Awards and recognition
In 2012 the 1955 Dodge Coronet Airport Courtesy Car at Benson Municipal provided by FBO SouthWestern Aviation, LLC was named "Airport Car of the Month" for June by EAA Sport Aviation Magazine.

References

External links 
 Benson Municipal Airport at Arizona DOT Airport Directory
 SouthWestern Aviation, LLC

Airports in Cochise County, Arizona
Benson, Arizona
1999 establishments in Arizona